WTAK-FM (106.1 MHz) is a classic rock-formatted radio station licensed to Hartselle, Alabama, and owned by San Antoniobased iHeartMedia, Inc. It serves Huntsville, Alabama, and the central Tennessee Valley area. Its broadcast tower is located on Brindlee Mountain in Morgan County, Alabama, near the Union Hill community, and its studios are located in Madison, Alabama.

In the 2000s, WTAK-FM was one of the top-rated radio stations in the Huntsville market.

Personalities
The on-air staff currently consists of "Deano," Johnny Maze, and "BigRig," who appear each weekday. The station's morning show is the syndicated The John Boy and Billy Big Show, heard weekday mornings from 5 to 9 a.m.

Programming
In addition to its regular music programming, WTAK-FM also carries The House of Hair with Dee Snider on Saturday nights from 9 p.m. to 12 a.m.  On Sunday mornings from 8 a.m. to 12 p.m., Flashback, hosted by Matt Pinfield, airs.

History
WTAK-FM was originally known by the call sign WYAM and went on the air around November 1991. WTAK-AM (1000 AM, now WDJL) shifted its programming solely to the 106.1 FM signal in late 1993 after several months of simulcast. This station was assigned the WTAK-FM call letters by the Federal Communications Commission on July 6, 1993.

References

External links
WTAK official website

TAK-FM
Classic rock radio stations in the United States
Radio stations established in 1991
IHeartMedia radio stations
1991 establishments in Alabama